William "Wild Bill" Ezinicki (March 11, 1924 – October 11, 2012) was a Canadian  professional ice hockey forward for the Toronto Maple Leafs (1944–1950), the Boston Bruins (1950–1952), and the New York Rangers (1954–1955) of the NHL.

Playing career
Ezinicki was born in Winnipeg, Manitoba. He was best known as a gritty hard-hitting player. He won the Stanley Cup three times with the Toronto Maple Leafs, in 1947, 1948 and 1949.

Later life
Ezinicki became a professional golfer after retiring from hockey. He was head professional at The International in Bolton, Massachusetts. He won several tournaments in the New England region including four state opens in 1960. He was elected to the New England section of the PGA Hall of Fame in 1997.

Ezinicki, a long-time resident of Bolton, Massachusetts, died at the age of 88 on October 11, 2012.

Career statistics

Regular season and playoffs

Achievements and awards
Memorial Cup Championship (1944)
Stanley Cup Championships (1947, 1948, & 1949)
Honoured Member of the Manitoba Hockey Hall of Fame

Golf tournament wins
this list may be incomplete
1956 New England PGA Championship
1958 New England PGA Championship, Rhode Island Open, New Hampshire Open
1959 Rhode Island Open
1960 Massachusetts Open, Rhode Island Open, New Hampshire Open, Maine Open
1964 Massachusetts Open
1965 Maritime Open
1969 Newfoundland Open

References

External links

Bill Ezinicki's  biography at Manitoba Hockey Hall of Fame
Bill Ezinicki’s biography at Manitoba Sports Hall of Fame
Profile at New England section PGA Hall of Fame

1924 births
2012 deaths
Boston Bruins players
Canadian ice hockey forwards
Canadian male golfers
Golfing people from Manitoba
Golfers from Massachusetts
Manitoba Sports Hall of Fame inductees
New York Rangers players
Oshawa Generals players
People from Bolton, Massachusetts
Pittsburgh Hornets players
Sportspeople from Worcester County, Massachusetts
Ice hockey people from Winnipeg
Stanley Cup champions
Toronto Maple Leafs players
Vancouver Canucks (WHL) players
Winnipeg Rangers players